The Detroit mayoral election of 2009 took place on November 3, 2009. It saw the reelection of incumbent mayor Dave Bing.

The election followed a special election held earlier that year to fill the vacancy created when Kwame Kilpatrick resigned as mayor.

Results

Primary election results
In the August 4 primary, Mayor Dave Bing captured nearly 74% of the vote. He and businessman Tom Barrow advanced to the November 3 general election.

General election results

References

Detroit
Detroit
2009
Detroit
mayoral election